Nakama (initiated 2015 in Oslo, Norway) is a Norwegian five-piece jazz ensemble led by the Norwegian bassist Christian Meaas Svendsen.

Biography 
Nakama is Japanese meaning "comrade", or a community of people where no one is above the other. The group was founded as a quartet in 2015 but expanded to quintet late 2016. Their music is influenced by European jazz, early American contemporary music, Japanese traditional music, and the harmonies of the romantic classical era. Furthermore, the music intimately explores the relation between content and non-content, and the possibilities of working with flexible forms on a fixed musical material.

Band members 

 Adrian Løseth Waade – violin
 Agnes Hvizdalek – vocals
 Andreas Wildhagen – drums
 Ayumi Tanaka – piano
 Christian Meaas Svendsen – upright bass

Discogs 
 2015: Before The Storm (Nakama Records)
 2016: Grand Line (Nakama Records)
 2016: Most Intimate (Nakama Records)
 2017: Worst Generation (Nakama Records)

References

External links 
 

Musical groups from Oslo
Norwegian jazz ensembles
Musical groups established in 2015
2015 establishments in Norway